The Cathedral of the Entry of the Virgin Mary into the Temple  is a Romanian Orthodox church located at Stada Bobâlna 28, Gherla.

The construction of the cathedral was completed in 1906. The church was the cathedral of the Eparchy of Gherla until 1930, when the headquarters moved to Cluj, in the Minorites Church, and the Gherla cathedral became a co-cathedral. Since 1948, when the Romanian Greek Catholic Church was outlawed by the communist regime, the building is used as a Romanian Orthodox parish.

In 2005, Patriarch Teoctist promised to return the church to its previous owner, but the transfer has yet to take place.

See also
Roman Catholicism in Romania
List of cathedrals in Romania

References

Former Greek-Catholic churches in Romania
Former cathedrals in Romania
Buildings and structures in Gherla
Byzantine Revival architecture in Romania
Romanian Orthodox churches in Romania
1906 establishments in Romania
20th-century churches in Romania